The 2016–17 West Bank Premier League is the 14th season of the top football league in the West Bank of Palestine. Hilal Al-Quds are the winning champions of the league for the season 2016/2017.

Teams
Ahli Al-Khaleel
Hilal Al-Quds
Markaz Balata
Markaz Tulkarm
Shabab Al-Dhahiriya
Shabab Al-Khadr
Shabab Al-Khalil
Shabab Alsamu
Shabab Dora
Shabab Yatta
Taraji Wadi Al-Nes
Thaqafi Tulkarm

League table

See also
2016-17 Gaza Strip Premier League
2016–17 Palestine Cup

References

West Bank Premier League seasons
1
West